Agatha Christie: The ABC Murders is a mystery adventure game for the Nintendo DS, based on Agatha Christie's 1936 novel The ABC Murders. The game was co-developed by American companies AWE Games and Black Lantern Studios, and published by DreamCatcher Interactive.

Gameplay
The game follows Hercule Poirot and Captain Hastings as they solve mysteries by inspecting crime scenes and questioning suspects.  In order to appeal to players familiar with the original story, the game also offers the option to play with a different murderer, which results in different clues and testimony throughout the entire game.

Reception

The game was met with a  poor reception, as GameRankings gave it a score of 53.82%, while Metacritic gave it 53 out of 100.

References

External links
 

Adventure games
Nintendo DS games
Nintendo DS-only games
2009 video games
Detective video games
Video games based on novels
Video games developed in the United States
Video games set in Hampshire
Video games set in Devon
Video games set in East Sussex
Black Lantern Studios games
Single-player video games